Daniel Ringo (October 27, 1803 – September 3, 1873) was a justice of the Arkansas Supreme Court, and later a United States district judge of the United States District Court for the District of Arkansas, the United States District Court for the Eastern District of Arkansas and the United States District Court for the Western District of Arkansas.

Education and career

Born on October 27, 1803, in Cross Plains, Kentucky, Ringo moved to Arkadelphia, Arkansas, in 1820, and became deputy clerk of the district court, and in 1825, clerk. Ringo read law in 1830, and entered private practice in Washington, Arkansas. In 1833 he moved to Little Rock, Arkansas Territory (State of Arkansas from June 15, 1836). where he continued to practice law until 1836. In 1836 was elected to the Arkansas Supreme Court, drawing the long term of eight years. He was chief justice until 1844, when he was defeated for re-election.

One evaluation of his service on the state supreme court said:

Federal judicial service

Ringo received a recess appointment from President Zachary Taylor on November 5, 1849, to a seat on the United States District Court for the District of Arkansas vacated by the death of Judge Benjamin Johnson. He was nominated to the same position by President Taylor on December 21, 1849. He was confirmed by the United States Senate on June 10, 1850, and received his commission the same day. Ringo was reassigned by operation of law to the United States District Court for the Eastern District of Arkansas and the United States District Court for the Western District of Arkansas on March 3, 1851, to a new joint seat authorized by 9 Stat. 594. His service terminated on May 6, 1861, due to his resignation, which came at the beginning of the American Civil War.

Later career and death

Following his resignation from the federal bench, Ringo served as a Judge of the Confederate District Court for the Districts of Arkansas from 1862 to 1863. He resumed private practice in Little Rock from 1865 to 1873, though "[i]n his later years he did little, for the adoption of the civil code had deprived him of his principal engine of legal warfare, the common-law pleading". He died on September 3, 1873, in Little Rock. He was interred in Mount Holly Cemetery in Little Rock.

References

Sources

External links

 

1803 births
1873 deaths
Judges of the United States District Court for the District of Arkansas
Judges of the United States District Court for the Eastern District of Arkansas
Judges of the United States District Court for the Western District of Arkansas
United States federal judges appointed by Zachary Taylor
19th-century American judges
Judges of the Confederate States of America
Chief Justices of the Arkansas Supreme Court
United States federal judges admitted to the practice of law by reading law
U.S. state supreme court judges admitted to the practice of law by reading law